Surdila-Găiseanca is a commune located in Brăila County, Muntenia, Romania. It is composed of two villages, Filipești and Surdila-Găiseanca.

Geography
The commune lies near the borders of Brăila and Buzău County, with only Făurei town in between. The Buzău River flows in a southwest-northeast direction to the north. The principal road passing through the commune is Highway 2B, which connects Buzău to Brăila, on the Danube to the east. A geographical feature of the commune is the Bărăgan Plain.

References

Communes in Brăila County
Localities in Muntenia